Paul Wynd (born 2 May 1976) is a former Australian rules football player. Wynd played three games for North Melbourne in the Australian Football League during the 1997 AFL season.

He is the brother of Scott Wynd and son of Garrey Wynd, both league footballers.

References

North Melbourne Football Club players
Jacana Football Club players
Australian rules footballers from Victoria (Australia)
1976 births
Living people